It Was All a Dream may refer to:

 A common phrase uttered to describe a dream sequence in storytelling
 It Was All a Dream (Dream album), 2001
 It Was All a Dream (Lil' Keke album), 1999
 "It Was All a Dream" (Atlanta)